Fiazaman (also Romanized as Fīāzamān, Feyāzamān, Feyāzmān, and Fīāzmān; also known as Paizamān, Pā-ye Zamān, and Qobāzmān) is a village in Shaban Rural District, in the Central District of Nahavand County, Hamadan Province, Iran. At the 2006 census, its population was 990, in 246 families.

References 

Populated places in Nahavand County